Florin Tița is a Romanian Greco-Roman wrestler. He won the silver medal in the 55 kg event at the 2019 European Wrestling Championships held in Bucharest, Romania. In the final, he lost against Vitali Kabaloev of Russia.

Career 

In 2018, he won one of the bronze medals in the men's 55 kg event at the European U23 Wrestling Championship held in Istanbul, Turkey. In 2020, he lost his bronze medal match in the 55 kg event at the 2020 European Wrestling Championships in Rome, Italy.

In 2022, he won the silver medal in his event at the Matteo Pellicone Ranking Series 2022 held in Rome, Italy.

Major results

References

External links 
 

Living people
Year of birth missing (living people)
Place of birth missing (living people)
Romanian male sport wrestlers
European Wrestling Championships medalists